Nelson Vogel Brittin (October 31, 1920 – March 7, 1951) was an American combat soldier who was killed in action during the Korean War. He was posthumously awarded the Medal of Honor for his actions in Yonggong-ni, Korea, on March 7, 1951.

Brittin graduated from Audubon High School in Audubon, New Jersey in 1939 and joined the United States Army in Audubon on July 7, 1942. He is buried in Beverly National Cemetery in Beverly, New Jersey.

Awards and decorations
Brittin's military awards include:

Medal of Honor

The President of the United States of America, in the name of Congress, takes pride in presenting the MEDAL OF HONOR (Posthumously) to 

Citation:For conspicuous gallantry and intrepidity above and beyond the call of duty while serving with Company I, 3d Battalion, 19th Infantry Regiment, 24th Infantry Division, in action against enemy aggressor forces at Yonggong-ni, Korea on 7 March 1951. Volunteering to lead his squad up a hill, with meager cover against murderous fire from the enemy, Sergeant First Class BRITTIN ordered his squad to give him support and, in the face of withering fire and bursting shells, he tossed a grenade at the nearest enemy position. On returning to his squad, he was knocked down and wounded by an enemy grenade. Refusing medical attention, he replenished his supply of grenades and returned, hurling grenades into hostile positions and shooting the enemy as they fled. When his weapon jammed, he leaped without hesitation into a foxhole and killed the occupants with his bayonet and the butt of his rifle. He continued to wipe out foxholes and, noting that his squad had been pinned down, he rushed to the rear of a machinegun position, threw a grenade into the nest, and ran around to its front, where he killed all three occupants with his rifle. Less than 100 yards up the hill, his squad again came under vicious fire from another camouflaged, sandbagged, machinegun nest well-flanked by supporting riflemen. Sergeant First Class BRITTIN again charged this new position in an aggressive endeavor to silence this remaining obstacle and ran direct into a burst of automatic fire which killed him instantly. In his sustained and driving action, he had killed 20 enemy soldiers and destroyed four automatic weapons. The conspicuous courage, consummate valor, and noble self-sacrifice displayed by Sergeant First Class BRITTIN enabled his inspired company to attain its objective and reflect the highest glory on himself and the heroic traditions of the military service.

See also

List of Korean War Medal of Honor recipients

References

1920 births
1951 deaths
United States Army Medal of Honor recipients
American military personnel killed in the Korean War
Audubon High School (New Jersey) alumni
People from Audubon, New Jersey
United States Army non-commissioned officers
Korean War recipients of the Medal of Honor
Burials at Beverly National Cemetery
United States Army personnel of World War II
United States Army personnel of the Korean War